Bảo Thắng is a rural district (huyện) of Lào Cai province in the Northeast region of Vietnam.

As of 2020, the district had a population of 103,262. The district covers an area of 651.98 km². The district capital lies at Phố Lu.

History
The administrative unit of Bảo Thắng was first established in 1059 by the Lý dynasty.

Administrative divisions
Bảo Thắng district is subdivided to 14 commune-level subdivisions, including the townships of Phố Lu, Nông trường Phong Hải, Tằng Loỏng and the rural communes of:  Bản Cầm, Bản Phiệt, Gia Phú, Phong Niên, Phú Nhuận, Sơn Hà, Sơn Hải, Thái Niên, Trì Quang, Xuân Giao, Xuân Quang.

References

Districts of Lào Cai province
Lào Cai province